Cecil Albert Price (2 December 1919 – February 2008) was a Welsh professional footballer who played as an outside forward. He joined hometown club Cardiff City in 1948, making his professional debut in a 3–1 defeat to West Ham United in October of the same year. However, he made no further appearances for the club and left to join Bradford City in 1949 where he finished his professional career.

References

1919 births
2008 deaths
Welsh footballers
Footballers from Cardiff
Cardiff City F.C. players
Bradford City A.F.C. players
English Football League players
Association football forwards